Nuzzi is an Italian surname. Notable people with the surname include:

Antonio Nuzzi (1926–2016), Italian Roman Catholic archbishop
Ferdinando Nuzzi (1644–1717), Italian Roman Catholic cardinal
Mario Nuzzi (1603–1673), Italian painter
Olivia Nuzzi (born 1993), American political journalist
Paolo Nuzzi (born 1939), Italian film director and screenwriter

Italian-language surnames